Laughanstown is a stop on the Luas light-rail tram system in Dún Laoghaire - Rathdown, south of Dublin, Ireland. It opened in 2010 as a stop on the extension of the Green Line south from Sandyford to Brides Glen. The stop provides access to the nearby suburb of Cabinteely.

History
The stop was intended to serve a new suburb being developed during the Celtic Tiger. A lack of subsequent development in the vicinity resulted in Laughanstown being the least used stop on the Luas Network. As of 2022, the land around the stop is again under development and new roads have been constructed close to the stop.

References

Luas Green Line stops in Dún Laoghaire–Rathdown
Railway stations opened in 2010
2010 establishments in Ireland
Railway stations in the Republic of Ireland opened in the 21st century